It Happened in Canada was a syndicated Canadian cartoon feature by Gordon Johnston that presented Canadian facts and achievements in a manner similar to Ripley's Believe It or Not!. As many as 65 newspapers in Canada carried the comic during its run from 1967 to the 1980s. Some episodes featured relatively obscure details about Prime Ministers such as R. B. Bennett and John Diefenbaker.

Works
Several collections of the comic were published as books:

References

Canadian comic strips
1967 comics debuts
Non-fiction comic strips
Comics set in Canada